ownCloud is an open-source software product for sharing and syncing of files in distributed and federated enterprise scenarios. It allows companies and remote end-users to organize their documents on servers, computers and mobile devices and work with them collaboratively, while keeping a centrally organized and synchronized state. ownCloud supports extensions like online document editing (Collabora, OnlyOffice, Microsoft 365 and Microsoft Office Online), calendar and contact synchronization. Users can work with documents from a browser, and there are clients for a variety of operating systems as well as mobile clients for Android and iPhone. 

Starting with version 2.0.0 "Infinite Scale", ownCloud is programmed in Go, and its web interface is written in Vue.js. Microservices, cloud-native Technologies and a three-tier-architecture without database replaced the formerly used LAMP stack while providing full API compatibility to prior versions. Up to version 10, ownCloud used PHP to access SQLite, MySQL or PostgreSQL databases on the server.

History 

ownCloud is a company from Nürnberg, Germany focused on enterprise users of its software. The ownCloud project was started in January 2010 and the company was founded in 2011. 

In 2016 one of the founders left the company, creating the fork Nextcloud. ownCloud GmbH continued operations, and in July 2016 secured financing from new investors and took over the business of the American company ownCloud Inc. 

In November 2022, ownCloud published version 2.0.0 "Infinite Scale", which was developed with help from the European Organization for Nuclear Research (CERN) and is a complete rewrite in the Go programming language. CERN uses ownCloud with its EOS filesystem to handle (as of 2021) 12 petabytes of data in 1.4 billion files.

Server releases

Overview

Design 

Desktop clients for ownCloud are available for Windows, macOS, FreeBSD and Linux, as well as mobile clients for iOS and Android devices. Files and other data (such as calendars, contacts or bookmarks) can also be accessed, managed, and uploaded using a web browser. Updates are pushed to all computers and mobile devices connected to an account. Encryption of files may be enforced by the server administrator.

Features 

ownCloud files are stored in conventional directory structures and can be accessed via WebDAV if necessary. User files are encrypted both at rest and during transit. ownCloud can synchronize with local clients running Windows, macOS and various Linux distributions. ownCloud users can manage calendars (CalDAV), contacts (CardDAV) scheduled tasks and streaming media (Ampache) from within the platform.

ownCloud permits user and group administration (via OpenID or LDAP). Content can be shared by granular read/write permissions between users or groups. Alternatively, ownCloud users can create public URLs for sharing files. Furthermore, users can interact with the browser-based ODF-format word processor, bookmarking service, URL shortening suite, gallery, RSS feed reader and document viewer tools from within ownCloud. ownCloud can be augmented with "one-click" applications and connection to Dropbox, Google Drive and Amazon S3.

Enterprise customers have access to apps with additional functionality, which are intended for organizations with more than 500 users. An Enterprise subscription includes support services. Commercial features include end-to-end encryption, ransomware and antivirus protection, branding, document classification, and single sign-on via OpenID.

See also 

 Comparison of file hosting services
 Comparison of file synchronization software
 Comparison of online backup services

References

External links 

 
 Forum for open source community and project

Cloud storage
Free software for cloud computing
Free software programmed in JavaScript
Free software programmed in PHP
Software using the GNU AGPL license
Internet software for Linux